The 2020 Louisville Cardinals football team represented the University of Louisville during the 2020 NCAA Division I FBS football season. This was the team's second season under head coach Scott Satterfield. The Cardinals played their home games at Cardinal Stadium, formerly known as Papa John's Cardinal Stadium, in Louisville, Kentucky, as a member of the Atlantic Coast Conference (ACC).

After compiling a 4–7 regular season record (3–7 in ACC play), Satterfield advised in mid-December that "we aren’t in line for a bowl" after Louisville's director of athletics conferred with ACC officials.

Schedule
Louisville had games scheduled against Kentucky, and Murray State, which were all canceled due to the COVID-19 pandemic. This will be the first season since 1993 that the Cardinals do not play Kentucky.

The ACC released their schedule on July 29, with specific dates selected on August 6.

Rankings

Game summaries

Western Kentucky

Miami

at No. 21 Panthers

at Georgia Tech

at Notre Dame

Florida State

Virginia Tech

at Virginia

Syracuse

at Boston College

Wake Forest

Players drafted into the NFL

References

Louisville
Louisville Cardinals football seasons
Louisville Cardinals football